John Shelton may refer to:
Sir John Shelton (1476/7–1539), courtier during the reign of Henry VIII of England
John Shelton (courtier) (c. 1503 – 1558), son of the above
John Shelton (British Army officer) (1791?–1845), British Army colonel
John F. Shelton (1903–1983), Australian rules footballer
John Shelton (actor) (1915–1972), American actor
Jack Shelton (1905–1941), Australian rules footballer
Jack Shelton (footballer) (1884–1918), English soccer player
John Shelton (Australian rules footballer) (born 1933), Australian footballer
John Shelton (artist) (1923–1993), English painter and ceramic artist
John Bailey Shelton (1875–1958), British archaeologist
John M. Shelton (1853–1923), American rancher and banker
John W. Shelton (1928–2014), American businessman and politician

See also
John Shelton Lawrence (active since 1977), American professor of philosophy
John Skelton (disambiguation), some of whom were also known as John Shelton
John Sheldon (disambiguation)
Jack Shelton (disambiguation)